Sverre Østbye  (28 July 1889 – 22 October 1984)  is a Norwegian Nordic skier who was awarded the Holmenkollen Medal in 1915.

References
Holmenkollen medalists - click Holmenkollmedaljen for downloadable pdf file 

Holmenkollen medalists
1889 births
1984 deaths